Andreas Volk (born 5 August 1996) is a German footballer who plays as a centre-back for Des Moines Menace in USL League Two.

Career
Volk made his professional debut for SpVgg Unterhaching in the 3. Liga on 16 May 2015, starting in the match against Preußen Münster which finished as a 1–0 home win.

References

External links
 Profile at DFB.de
 Profile at kicker.de
 Profile at fussball.de

1996 births
Living people
People from Gengenbach
Sportspeople from Freiburg (region)
Footballers from Baden-Württemberg
German footballers
Association football central defenders
SpVgg Unterhaching players
FC Augsburg II players
3. Liga players
Regionalliga players
SpVgg Unterhaching II players